A bus driver, bus operator, or bus captain  is a person who drives buses for a living.

Description 
Bus drivers must have a special license above and beyond a regular driver's licence. Bus drivers typically drive their vehicles between bus stations or stops. Bus drivers often drop off and pick up passengers on a predetermined route schedule. In British English a different term, coach driver, is used for drivers on privately booked long-distance routes, tours and school trips.

There are various types of bus drivers, including transit drivers, school bus drivers and tour bus drivers. Bus drivers may work for a city, public (state and national/federal) governments, school boards, and private enterprises, such as charter companies which run tour buses. Coach captains in Australia are frequently freelance sub-contractors who work for various bus and coach companies.

When there is no conductor present, the driver is the sole operator of the service and handles ticketing and interaction with customers, in addition to driving.

Intercity bus driver

An intercity bus driver is a bus driver whose duties involve driving a bus between cities. It is one of four common positions available to those capable of driving buses (the others being school, transit, or tour bus driving). Intercity bus drivers may be employed for public or private companies. It varies by country which is more common. But many countries have regulations on the training and certification requirements and the hours of intercity drivers.

In the United States, intercity bus driving is one of the fastest growing jobs, with attractive wages and good benefits.

Duties
Besides the actual operation of the bus, duties of the intercity bus driver include cleaning, inspecting, and maintaining the vehicle, doing simple repairs, checking tickets of passengers or in some cases, collecting fares, loading passengers on and off the bus efficiently, handling the passengers' luggage, enforcing guidelines expected from passengers (such as prohibiting yelling), and dealing with certain types of emergencies.

Good communication skills in the native language of the country and other languages spoken by a large part of the population are also key. Drivers must be able to engage in basic communication with passengers and to give them directions and other information they may need.

Some countries require intercity bus drivers to fill out logs detailing the hours they have driven. This documents they are compliant with the country's laws regarding the maximum number of hours they are permitted to drive.

Training
In the United States, intercity bus drivers are required to hold a Commercial Driver's License (CDL) with P endorsement. The requirements for this vary by country, but require more training than driving a passenger automobile. Safe driving skills and the willingness to obey traffic laws and handle driving under a variety of weather and traffic conditions are essential, as passengers expect a safe trip, and the safety of those in other vehicles on the road is necessary.

Those hired as intercity bus are often expected to have prior experience in the operation of a commercial vehicle. This may include the operation of a municipal bus service, school buses, or trucks.

New hires by companies are often oriented to their jobs by first riding along for one or more runs on a route, then driving the route under supervision of an experienced driver, or driving the route unsupervised without any passengers. After passing the training, most new hires will only work as backups until a permanent position can be offered.

Scheduling
Intercity bus drivers are provided with a lot of independence, though they are expected to follow a particular route and schedule as determined by their employer.

On shorter routes, it is possible for a driver to make a round trip and return home on the same day, and sometimes to complete a round trip multiple times in a single day.

On longer routes that exceed or come close to the maximum number of hours an operator can legally drive, drivers will be changed over the course of the route. Either the driver will drive half the work day in one direction, and switch places before driving part of a trip in the other direction on a different vehicle, or the driver will drive the maximum amount of time permitted by law in a single direction, stay overnight, and complete a return trip on the following day. When the latter occurs, the employer will often pay lodging and dining expenses for the driver.

An issue with intercity bus drivers, especially those on longer routes, is taking short breaks for eating and restroom use. Stopping to meet these human needs is a necessity. But making these stops delays the trip, which many passengers want to be as quick and efficient as possible. Often, the driver will pass these breaks onto the passengers and allow them to enjoy the benefits of the break as well.

Safety
Intercity bus driving is generally safe but carries its risks for drivers. Accidents occur, which can be harmful to the driver, passengers, and those in other vehicles involved alike. Dealing with unruly passengers can be another challenge, something which operators are not generally equipped to handle. Such passengers can be harmful to the driver and other passengers alike.

There have also been incidents which have occurred involving intercity bus drivers being assaulted by passengers. One such event occurred on October 3, 2001, when Damir Igric slit a Greyhound driver's throat, resulting in seven deaths (including Igric himself) as the bus crashed.

By country

Australia 
In Australia, bus and coach drivers need a Drivers Licence (issued in an Australian state or territory) for the class of vehicle they drive.

Additionally, they are required to possess a driver authorisation to drive a bus (also issued by the state or territory). This has different names in different states, for example, Driver Authorisation in Queensland, Driver Accreditation in Victoria, General Driver Authorisation in New South Wales, Public Passenger Vehicle Ancillary Certificate in Tasmania and so on.  This authorisation entails a regular review of driving history, criminal history, and medical assessment for fitness to drive.

In 2012, Australia had a fleet of 90,599 buses and collectively travelled about 2.0 billion km.  The average age of the national fleet is 11.0 years.

In 2011, there were 40,900 bus and coach drivers employed in the industry.  They work an average of 41.7 hours/week and the average age is 54 years.  The main employing industries are Transport, Postal and Warehousing 87.4%, and the remainder include Health Care and Social Assistance 4%, Education and Training 3.1%, and Accommodation and Food Services 2.7%.

New Zealand 
Bus and coach drivers require either a class 2 or class 4 heavy vehicle licence corresponding to the weight and number of axles of their vehicle. Drivers must apply for a P (passenger) endorsement from NZ Transport Agency and hold a large passenger service licence to take fare-paying passengers.

Drivers of school buses for special needs children must comply with SESTA requirements.

Singapore 

Bus captains generally require a class 3 or class 4 license to drive. Some companies have different rules.

Most bus captains in Singapore work for the major public operators in the country such as SBS Transit and SMRT.
Tower Transit Singapore and Go-Ahead Singapore are foreign bus companies operating in Singapore. An average bus captain makes about $2000 to $3000 a month. Although some companies have been offering more recently. 

Most bus captains tend to work long hours and raises concerns for the public transport industry in the country. Majority of the bus captains are foreigners because most Singaporeans do not prefer working as such. Companies aim to employ more local workers.

United Kingdom 

In the United Kingdom drivers must have passed the Passenger Carrying Vehicle (PCV) practical driving and theory test. PCV drivers also have to possess a Certificate of Professional Competence card which requires extra training to be taken. Service bus drivers in the UK are not subject to the working hours restrictions devised by the European Union if their journeys do not exceed 30 miles radius, but are governed by less stringent UK Drivers' Hours Regulations. For example, a service bus driver may drive for 5.5 hours without a break in the UK.

People with certain medical conditions are excluded from becoming bus drivers. Some of these conditions include migraines (if they affect vision), alcoholism and epilepsy.

Because of the additional workload many buses are fitted with closed-circuit television in an attempt to protect drivers from an increasing number of attacks which has resulted in a recruitment crisis in some British cities.

United States 

, there are approximately 687,200 U.S. employed bus drivers.  One of the most common jobs in the United States for a bus driver is to work for a public school, transporting students aboard a school bus to and from the school building. As of 2004, 71% of bus drivers in the U.S. were employed by schools. In other countries, school transport is often provided by the same companies that run other bus services in the area, so school bus driver is not a separate position.

In the United States, finding a position as a bus driver usually requires that the individual possess a commercial driver's license (CDL) and specialized training for the vehicle, as well as a Passenger endorsement.  Various other educational and vocational training are usually required, but this varies from place to place.

See also 

Bus conductor
Hours of service (USA)
Drivers' working hours (EU)
List of bus operating companies

References

External links
BLS info on bus drivers

 
Transport occupations